The following is a list of films produced in the Kannada film industry in India in 1999, presented in alphabetical order.

Highest Grossing Films 
 A.K.47(film)
 Upendra
 Suryavamsha
 Habba
 Veerappa Nayaka
 Chandramukhi Pranasakhi
 Hrudaya Hrudaya
 Sambhrama
 Naanu Nanna Hendthiru
 Snehaloka

Released Films

See also 

 Kannada films of 1998
 Kannada films of 2000

External links
 Kannada Movies of 1999 at the Internet Movie Database

1999
Kannada
 Kannada
1999 in Indian cinema